Eutaw–Madison Apartment House Historic District is a national historic district in Baltimore, Maryland, United States. It consists of a group of three multi-story apartment buildings built in the first quarter of the 20th century.  They are: The Esplanade, a 9-story apartment building built in 1912; the Emersonian, an 8-story building constructed in 1915 of stuccoed masonry; and Temple Gardens, a 14-story building built in 1926. The district is significant in part because of its association with Baltimore's Jewish community. During the 19th century, the Eutaw–Madison neighborhood became a center for the Jewish community in Baltimore. By the 1920s the neighborhood had been established firmly as a neighborhood of middle and upper-class Jews, many of whom were professionals and merchants.

It was added to the National Register of Historic Places in 1983.

References

External links
, including undated photo, at Maryland Historical Trust

American middle class
Historic districts in Baltimore
Apartment buildings in Baltimore
Jews and Judaism in Baltimore
Reservoir Hill, Baltimore
Residential buildings on the National Register of Historic Places in Baltimore
Historic districts on the National Register of Historic Places in Maryland
Upper class culture in Maryland